RNZ National, formerly Radio New Zealand National, and known until 2007 as the National Programme or National Radio, is a publicly funded non-commercial New Zealand English-language radio network operated by Radio New Zealand. It specialises in programmes dedicated to news, the arts, music, and New Zealand culture generally, including some material in the Māori language. Historically the programme was broadcast on the (AM) "YA" stations 1YA, 2YA, 3YA and 4YA in the main centres.

In 2013, RNZ National had a 10.3 per cent market share, the highest nationwide and up from 9.1 per cent in 2009. Market share peaked at 11.1 per cent in 2011, probably due to the station's coverage of the Christchurch earthquake. In 2014 493,000 people listened to RNZ National over the course of a week – the second-largest cumulative audience. A 2021 survey estimated 609,800 listeners (13.5% of the 10+ population), Morning Report being the most popular, with 434,000 listeners.

Its sister station is RNZ Concert.

Stations

RNZ National's programming is distributed via several means. RNZ National was the first network in New Zealand to incorporate the Radio Data System in its FM signal. Most FM frequencies are 101FM state-owned public service licences and some are held by non-profit community organisations. RNZ National broadcasts its FM signal in mono, but the on-line and terrestrial Freeview HD services are available in stereo.

RNZ-owned frequencies

These are the RNZ-owned frequencies of RNZ National:

 Kaitaia – Maungataniwha – 101.1 FM
 Kaikohe – Hikurangi – 101.5 FM
 Kaikohe – Ohaeawai – 981 AM
 Whangarei – Otaika – 837 AM
 Whangarei – Horokaka – 101.2 FM
 Whangarei – Parahaki – 104.4 FM
 Auckland – Henderson – 756 AM
 Auckland – Sky Tower – 101.4 FM
 Hamilton – Eureka – 1143 AM
 Hamilton – Te Aroha – 101.0 FM
 Tauranga – Paengaroa – 819 AM
 Tauranga – Kopukairua – 101.4 FM
 Tokoroa – Wiltsdown – 729 AM
 Tokoroa – Te Aroha – 101.0 FM
 Rotorua – Tihiotonga – 1188 AM
 Rotorua – Tihiotonga – 101.5 FM
 Whakatane – Mount Edgecumbe – 101.7 FM
 Taupo – Whakaroa – 101.6 FM
 Taupo – Mountain Road – 104.8 FM
 Gisborne – Wheatstone Road – 101.3 FM
 Gisborne – Wainui – 1314 AM
 Hawke's Bay – Opapa – 630 AM
 Hawke's Bay – Mount Erin – 101.5 FM
 New Plymouth – Mount Egmont – 101.2 FM
 Palmerston North – Kairanga – 1449 AM
 Palmerston North – Wharite – 101.0 FM
 Whanganui – Titahi Bay – 567 AM
 Whanganui – Mount Jowett – 101.6 FM
 Masterton – Waingawa – 1071 AM
 Masterton – Otahoua – 101.5 FM
 Kapiti – Forest Heights – 101.5 FM
 Wellington – Titahi Bay – 567 AM
 Wellington – Kaukau – 101.3 FM
 Wellington – Towai – 101.7 FM
 Blenheim – Titahi Bay – 567 AM
 Blenheim – Wither Hills – 101.7 FM
 Nelson – Grampians – 101.6 FM
 Nelson – Stoke – 1116 AM
 Westport – Cape Foulwind – 1458 AM
 Greymouth – Paparoa – 101.1 FM
 Christchurch – Gebbies Pass – 675 AM
 Christchurch – Sugarloaf – 101.7 FM
 Ashburton – Gawler Downs – 101.3 FM
 Timaru – Fairview – 918 AM
 Timaru – Mount Studholme – 101.1 FM
 Wanaka – Mount Maude – 101.0 FM
 Queenstown – Peninsula Hill – 101.6 FM
 Alexandra – Obelisk – 101.5 FM
 Dunedin – Highcliff – 810 AM
 Dunedin – Highcliff – 101.4 FM
 Invercargill – Dacre – 720 AM
 Invercargill – Hedgehope – 101.2 FM

Other broadcasting methods

These are the community-owned frequencies and other broadcasting methods of RNZ National:

 Te Kuiti – 94.0 FM
 Tākaka – Mount Burnett – 98.2 FM
 Reefton – 88.0 FM (low power)
 Lake Tekapo – Mount John – 93.4 FM
 Twizel – Mount Mary – 92.6 FM
 Omarama – Cloud Hill – 97.3 FM
 Otematata – 106.7 FM (low power)
 Milford Sound – Milford Sound Hotel – 92.0 FM
 Te Anau – Ramparts Road – 101.6 FM
 In-stereo Internet Audio Streaming
 Podcasts
 iHeartRadio
 Unencrypted satellite broadcast
 Sky Television DHS encrypted satellite broadcast
 TelstraClear cable TV in Wellington
 TelstraClear cable TV in Christchurch
 Freeview television channel 50

References

External links
 Official page RNZ National

 
1925 establishments in New Zealand